The 2010-11 Women's LEN Trophy was the 12th edition of the second tier of LEN's international competitions for women's water polo clubs. Twenty teams from eleven countries took part in the competition, which ran from 10 December 2010 to 20 April 2011.

ASD Rapallo Nuoto defeated Het Ravijn in the final, overcoming a 7-goals loss in the first leg, to win the competition. Szentesi VK and SKIF Izmaylovo also reached the semifinals. It was the seventh time the trophy went to Italy, with Rapallo Nuoto becoming the fourth Italian team to win the competition after Gifa Palermo, CC Ortigia and ASD Roma.

Federation team allocation
Each national federation can enter up to two teams into the LEN Trophy.

Distribution

Teams

Qualification round

Group A

Group B

Group C

Group D

Preliminary round

Group A

Group B

Group C

Group D

Quarter-finals

Semifinals

Final

References

Women's LEN Trophy seasons
Women, Trophy
LEN trophy women
LEN trophy women
LEN
LEN